The Book of Degrees of the Royal Genealogy (Степенная книга) was the first official work of historiography produced in the nascent Tsardom of Russia. It was commissioned by Macarius, Metropolitan of Moscow from Ivan the Terrible's personal confessor, Andrew, in 1560. This vast work of codification recast historical data compiled from medieval Russian chronicles so as to suit Ivan's tastes and ambitions in the wake of his coronation as the first Russian Czar.

The book gave shape to the idea of Moscow being the "Third Rome" by tracing Ivan's patrilineal descent not only from Rurik but from the first Roman emperor, Augustus. This fantasy genealogy was borrowed from the earlier Tale of the Princes of Vladimir. The compilation is subdivided into 17 parts, or degrees (hence the title). Each degree corresponds to a generation of Ivan's royal ancestors.

According to Arthur Voice, the book "glorifies to the utmost the historic past and the present of Muscovite Rus', primarily by extolling the rulers as having acted in full accord with the church". The biographies of Kievan, Vladimir-Suzdal and Muscovite rulers tend to pass over into hagiography. Each monarch is presented as a saint, and his actions are cast as "holy deeds". The political philosophy of the time tends to be obscured by thick layers of bombast and rhetoric.

References

Sources

Further reading 
 First part of the 1775 publication by Nikolay Novikov
 Second part of the 1775 publication by Nikolay Novikov

1560s in Russia
16th-century history books
History books about the Grand Duchy of Moscow
Russian non-fiction books
Russia
1560 books